Gymnocalycium leeanum is a species of Gymnocalycium from Argentina.

References

External links
 
 

leeanum
Flora of Argentina